Edmundo Desnoes (Havana, Cuba, 1930), is a Cuban writer author of the novel Memorias del subdesarrollo  (Memories of Underdevelopment), a complex story depicting the alienation of a Cuban bourgeois  intellectual struggling to adapt to the process of the Revolution staying on the island after his family decides to leave the country.  He originally called the work Inconsolable Memories in the first English edition. The book was adapted in 1968 into the seminal Cuban film of the same title Memorias del Subdesarrollo (Memories of Underdevelopment)  by the director Tomás Gutiérrez Alea, the name by which it is also known in English.

During the 1960s and 1970s, while living in Cuba, Desnoes wrote for the newspaper "La Revolucion" and was editor of art and literature for the Editorial Nacional de Cuba and El Instituto del Libro, and was a member of the editorial board of Casa de Las Americas and was also professor of Cultural History at the Escuela de Diseño Industrial (2)  He has lived in New York City since 1979. In 2008 he published Memorias del Desarrollo a follow-up to his original novel which was adapted by Miguel Coyula into the 2010 movie Memories of Overdevelopment.  He has focused his writing on essays, short stories, art reviews, poetry, and many novels.

See also
Herman Puig

References
2. https://montgomery.dartmouth.edu/edmundo-desnoes

Living people
Cuban male novelists
Cuban essayists
Male essayists
Year of birth missing (living people)